This is a partial list of molecules that contain 25 to 29 carbon atoms.

C25

C26

C27

C28

C29

See also
 Carbon number

C25